Chak Sara (also Romanized as Chāk Sarā; also known as Chak Safā and Chāk Sar) is a village in Lafur Rural District, North Savadkuh County, Mazandaran Province, Iran. At the 2006 census, its population was 34, in 17 families.

References 

Populated places in Savadkuh County